Valerian Ivanovich Abakovsky (5 October 1895 – 24 July 1921) was a Soviet engineer who is best remembered as the inventor of the Aerowagon.

Early life
He was born in Riga on October 5, 1895 in to a Russian family. Although a talented inventor, he worked as a chauffeur for the Tambov Cheka.

The Aerowagon 

The invention for which Abakovsky is remembered is the Aerowagon, an experimental high-speed railcar fitted with an airplane engine and propeller propulsion. It was originally intended to carry Soviet officials.

Death 

On 24 July 1921, a group of communists led by Soviet politician Fyodor Sergeyev took the Aerowagon from Moscow to the Tula collieries to test it. Abakovsky was also on board. Although they successfully arrived in Tula, on the return route to Moscow the Aerowagon derailed at high speed, killing 7 of the 22 on board. The following people died in the accident:

 , Bulgarian delegate
 Paul Freeman, Australian delegate
 Oskar Helbrich, German delegate
 John William Hewlett, British delegate
 Fyodor Sergeyev (known as "Comrade Artyom")
 Otto Strupat (born 1893), German delegate
 Valerian Abakovsky himself, at the age of 25.

The seven men killed in the crash lay in state at the House of the Unions, after which they were buried in the Kremlin Wall Necropolis. Sergeyev is buried in Mass Grave No. 12,  Konstantinov, Abakovsky and Freeman are buried in  Mass Grave No. 13, while Strupat, Helbrich and Hewlett are buried in Mass Grave No. 14.

References
 Alexey Abramov / Алексей Абрамов, By the Kremlin Wall / У кремлёвской стены, Moscow / Москва́, Politizdat / Политиздат, 1978, pp./стр. 399 

1895 births
1921 deaths
Engineers from Riga
People from Kreis Riga
Bolsheviks
Soviet communists
Soviet inventors
Burials at the Kremlin Wall Necropolis
Inventors killed by their own invention
Railway accident deaths in Russia
Accidental deaths in the Soviet Union